The 1977 International cricket season was from May 1977 to August 1977.

Season overview

June

Australia in England

References

1977 in cricket